This is a list of professional football clubs located in Albania, sorted alphabetically by division.

Clubs by division

Kategoria Superiore

1° Division

2° Division

3° Division

Women's League
Vllaznia is considered the successor to Ada who disbanded in 2013. Prior to this, Ada had won 3 league titles and 1 cup title.

Albania

clubs
football clubs